Zenobia Jacobs is a South African-born archaeologist and earth scientist specialising in geochronology. She is a professor at the University of Wollongong, Australia.

Education and career 
Jacobs graduated from the University of Stellenbosch in South Africa, in 1998, studying archaeology and geography, and received her PhD from Aberystwyth University, Wales, in 2004. She joined the University of Wollongong as a research fellow in 2006 and is currently a professor in the Centre for Archaeological Science and the School of Earth of Environmental Sciences. She is also an Australian Research Council (ARC) Future Fellow and chief investigator in the ARC Centre of Excellence for Australian Biodiversity and Heritage. She was awarded the International Union for Quaternary Research's Sir Nick Shackleton Medal in 2009.

Jacobs' research traces the evolutionary history of humans using single-grain optically stimulated luminescence dating. Her work on the Denisovans and Neanderthals has helped establish a timeline of when the two groups of archaic humans were present in southern Siberia and the environmental conditions they faced before going extinct. She has also contributed to reconstructions of past environments in Africa, using ancient high sea-levels as analogues for future trends, and studies of the ecological footprint of the first humans to reach Australia and Madagascar.

Selected publications

References 

Geochronology
Australian women scientists
Living people
Australian archaeologists
Year of birth missing (living people)
Academic staff of the University of Wollongong
21st-century Australian scientists
21st-century archaeologists
21st-century women scientists
Stellenbosch University alumni
Alumni of Aberystwyth University